The IEEE Journal on Selected Areas in Communications is a monthly peer-reviewed scientific journal published by the IEEE Communications Society that focuses on telecommunications. The journal was established in 1983 and the editor-in-chief is Petar Popovski (Aalborg University). According to the Journal Citation Reports, the journal has a 2021 impact factor of 13.081.

References

External links
 Journal page at the IEEE Communications Society

Engineering journals
Selected Areas in Communications
Publications established in 1983
English-language journals
Monthly journals